Elizabeth Gray or Grey may refer to:

People
Elizabeth Gray (artist) (died 1903), Irish artist
Elizabeth Gray (British artist) (1928 - 2022), British artist
Elizabeth Gray (broadcaster), Canadian radio broadcaster
Elizabeth Gray (fossil collector) (1831–1924), Scottish malacologist
Elizabeth Grey, 6th Baroness Lisle (c. 1482–c. 1525), English noble woman who flourished during the reigns of Henry VII and VIII
Elizabeth Grey, Countess of Kildare (c. 1497 – after 1548), English noblewoman, and the second wife of Irish peer Gerald FitzGerald, 9th Earl of Kildare
Elizabeth Grey, Viscountess Lisle (1505–1519), Tudor noblewoman jilted for Mary Tudor
Elizabeth Grey, Countess of Kent (1582–1651), née Elizabeth Talbot, daughter of the Earl of Shrewsbury
Elizabeth Caroline Gray (1810–1887), Scottish historian
Elizabeth Caroline Grey (1798–1869), English author
Elizabeth Gray Vining (1902–1999), born Elizabeth Gray, librarian
Elizabeth Woodville (c. 1437–1492), married name Elizabeth Grey, her second husband was Edward IV of England

Fictional entities
Elizabeth "Polly" Grey, a fictional character in the TV series Peaky Blinders

See also
Betsy Gray (died 1798), Ulster-Scots Presbyterian peasant girl who took part of the 1798 Rebellion of the United Irishmen